Commentary on the Apocalypse (Commentaria in Apocalypsin) is a book written in the eighth century by the Spanish monk and theologian Beatus of Liébana (730–785) and copied and illustrated in manuscript in works called "Beati" during the 10th and 11th centuries AD. It is a commentary on the New Testament Apocalypse of John or Book of Revelation. It also refers to any manuscript copy of this work, especially any of the 27 illuminated copies that have survived. It is often referred to simply as the Beatus. The historical significance of the Commentary is made even more pronounced since it included a world map, which offers a rare insight into the geographical understanding of the post-Roman world. Well-known copies include the Morgan, the Saint-Sever, the Gerona, the Osma and the Madrid (Vitr 14-1) Beatus codices.

Considered together, the Beatus codices are among the most important Spanish manuscripts and have been the subject of extensive scholarly and antiquarian enquiry. The illuminated versions now represent the best known works of Mozarabic art, and had some influence on the medieval art of the rest of Europe.

The Commentary on the Apocalypse (Commentaria in Apocalypsin)
The work consists of several prologues (which differ among the manuscripts) and one long summary section (the "Summa Dicendum") before the first book, an introduction to the second book, and 12 books of commentary, some long and some very short. Beatus states in its dedication to his friend Bishop Etherius that it is meant to educate his brother monks.

The work is structured around selections from previous Apocalypse commentaries and references by Ticonius (now mostly lost), St. Primasius of Hadrumetum, St. Caesarius of Arles, St. Apringius of Beja, and many others. There are also long extracts from the texts of the Fathers of the Church and Doctors of the Church, especially Augustine of Hippo, Ambrose of Milan, Irenaeus of Lyons, Pope Gregory I, Saint Jerome of Stridon, and Isidore of Seville. Some manuscripts add commentaries on the books of Ezekiel and Daniel by other authors, genealogical tables, and the like, but these are not strictly part of the Beatus.

The creative character of the Commentary comes from Beatus' writing of a wide-ranging catena of verses from nearly every book of the Bible, quotes of patristic commentary from many little known sources, and interstitial original comments by Beatus. His attitude is one of realism about church politics and human pettiness, hope and love towards everyday life even when it is difficult, and many homely similes from his own time and place. (For example, he compares evangelization to lighting fires for survival when caught far from home by a sudden mountain blizzard, and the Church to a Visigothic army with both generals and muleskinners.) His work is also a fruitful source for Spanish linguistics, as Beatus often alters words in his African Latin sources to the preferred synonyms in Hispanic Latin.

The message

The Kingdom of Toledo fell in 711, leaving most of the Iberian Peninsula in the hands of Muslim conquerors. Christians under Pelayo managed to establish one kingdom on the northern coast, protected by the Cantabrian Mountains. Beautus lived in the Cantabrian valley of Liébana. With the recent conquest of the Iberian Peninsula, the Apocalypse and the symbolism in it took on a different meaning. The beast, which had previously been believed to represent the Roman Empire, now became the Caliphate, and Babylon was no longer Rome, but Córdoba.

In continuity with previous commentaries written in the Tyconian tradition, and in continuity with St. Isidore of Seville and St. Apringius of Beja from just a few centuries before him, Beatus' Commentary on the Apocalypse focuses on the sinless beauty of the eternal Church, and on the tares growing among the wheat in the Church on Earth. Persecution from outside forces like pagan kings and heretics is mentioned, but it is persecution from fellow members of the Church that Beatus spends hundreds of pages on. Anything critical of the Jews in the Bible is specifically said to have contemporary effect as a criticism of Christians, and particularly of monks and other religious, and a good deal of what is said about pagans is stated as meant as a criticism of Christians who worship their own interests more than God. Muslims are barely mentioned, except as references to Christian heresies include them. Revelation is a book about the Church's problems throughout all ages, not about history per se. In the middle of Book 4 of 12, Beatus does state his guess about the end-date of the world (801 AD, from the number of the Holy Spirit plus Alpha, as well as a few other calculations) although he warns people that it is folly to try to guess a date that even Jesus in the Bible claimed not to know.

Copies of the manuscript
There are 35 surviving copies, 27 of which are illustrated below:

Illustrated in the Iberian Peninsula

9th through 11th centuries

12th and 13th centuries
 Beatus of Navarra. (Beatus of Liébana - Navarra Codex). Circa 12th century, 60 illuminations. Kept at Bibliothèque Nationale de France, Paris. Ms. Nouv. Acq. Lat. 1366
 Beatus of Turin. (''Beato de Turín) (Beatus of Liébana - Turin Codex) Held at Biblioteca Nazionale Universitaria, Turin. J.II.1 (olim lat.93). 214 folios, 360 x 275 mm, 106 miniatures Date of creation unknown. 12th century.
 Rylands Beatus [R]: Manchester, John Rylands Library Latin MS 8), ca. 1175.
 Cardeña Beatus. (Beatus of San Pedro de Cardeña). (códice del Monasterio de San Pedro de Cardeña, Burgos). Ca. 1180. Document split up; many pages unaccounted for. Currently accounted for folios are dispersed between collections in 1) Museo Arqueológico Nacional in Madrid Ms. 2. (127 folios), 2) Metropolitan Museum of Art in New York (15 folios), 3) the private collection of Francisco de Zabálburu y Basabe (2 folios), 4) Museu d’Art de Girona in Girona (1). A facsimile edition by M. Moleiro Editor has gathered them all to recreate the original volume as it was. The Museo Arqueológical Nacional reports that the Diocesan Museum of Gerona has a folio and the Collection Heredia-Spínola of Madrid has a folio-and a-half.
 Beatus of Lorvão [L] written in 1189 in the monastery of St Mammas in Lorvão (Portugal); Arquivo Nacional da Torre do Tombo in Lisbon.
Beatus of Las Huelgas. (Beatus of Liébana - Huelga Codex). Circa 1220. 90+ miniatures, kept at The Morgan Library & Museum, New York. M. 429 Produced in royal monastery of Las Huelgas, probably commissioned by the queen Berengaria of Castile, sister of Alfonso VIII. (Not the Morgan Beatus, see above)
 Arroyo Beatus Copied 1st half of the 13th century, c. 1220 in the region of Burgos, perhaps in the monastery of San Pedro de Cardeña. Paris (Bibliothèque nationale) NAL 2290 and New York (Bernard H. Breslauer Collection).
Beatus of San Salvador de Távara. Ca. 968 / 970. Madrid. Archivo Historico Nacional. Ms 1097 B (1240). Painted by Magius, finished after his death by his pupil Emeterius.

Not illustrated
Beatus of Alcobaça. ALC. 247 Not illustrated.
Beato ACA. Not Illustrated.
Beato de Sahagún. Fragments. Not illustrated.

Copied in South Italy
Genevan Beatus. Kept at the Bibliothèque de Genève. 'Ms. lat. 357. Circa mid-to-late eleventh century. Originated in South Italy, Beneventan region. 97 Folios in 13 books.
Berlin Beatus. (Beatus of Liébana, Berlin Codex). (Beatus Commentary written in Carolingian script with Beneventan notations). Kept in Staatsbibliothek, Preussischer Kulturbesitz, Berlin. Ms. theol. lat. fol. 561 12th century. 98 Folios One of three Beatus manuscripts made outside Iberian Peninsula.
Beneventan Beatus fragment. Kept at Milan, Archivio di Stato Rubriche, Notarili 3823, fol. 2v.

Copied in Southwestern France
Saint-Sever Beatus. (Beatus of Saint-Sever). Illustrated by Stephanus Garsia (and other unnamed). Kept at the Bibliothèque Nationale de France, Paris. C. 1038. Alternate dates include 1060–1070. Ms. Lat. 8878.

Influence
The Commentary on the Apocalypse strongly influenced the Guernica of Picasso.

Gallery

Notes

References

The Illustrated Beatus: a corpus of the illustrations of the commentary on the Apocalypse by John Williams. 5 Volumes. Harvey Miller and Brepols, 1994, 1998, 2000. Art books attempting to document all the Beatus illustrations in all surviving manuscripts. Due to expense, most illustrations are reproduced in black and white. Unfortunately, Williams was uninterested in Beatus' text, and thus spread some misconceptions about it, but his art scholarship and tenacity are amazing. His books' influence on most of this Wikipedia article is strong.

Further reading
Commentarius in Apocalypsin. Ed. Henry A. Sanders. Papers and monographs of the American Academy in Rome 7 (Rome: American Academy in Rome, 1930). The first critical edition of the commentary. Latin.
Beati Liebanensis Tractatus de Apocalipsin. Ed. Roger Gryson. Corpus Christianorum: Series Latina 107 B-C (Turnhout: Brepols, 2012). Two volumes of a new, improved and up-to-date critical edition of the commentary's text. Latin and French.
Commentary on the Apocalypse - Part I. Trans. M.S. O'Brien. (2013). English translation of Books I and II. Includes many sources and quotes not noted in Gryson.

External links

In Apocalypsin, 1770 edition of the Commentary. Latin.
 A selection of the most relevant Beatus, advertisement for facsimile editions
Illuminations of Beatus
Works of Beatus
Miniatures from the Rylands Beatus

Links to specific manuscripts
Arroyo Beatus
Arroyo Beatus  Another way to view
 Ms. 33 Beato de San Millan de la Cogolla.
Ms. 33 Beato de San Millan de la Cogolla. (Select images)
Ms. 33 (black and white images)
Ms. Cod. & II.5 Escorial Beatus of San Millán.
Ms 644 Morgan Beatus. Click on image to access all pages.
Ms 1097 B Beatus of San Salvador de Távara. Click on image to access all pages.
 AHN CODICES,L.1097 Beatus of Tábara
 Códice 44 Beato de Lorvão
Ms. 433 Beatus of Valcavado Click on image to access all pages.
Ms. 26 Urgell Beatus. Click on image to access all pages.
 Ms. 7 Gerona Beatus (Girona Beatus) Click on image to access all pages.
Vit. 14-1 Beati in Apocalipsin libri duodecim. (Emilianenses Codice)
VITR 14.2 (pdf)Beato of Liébana: Codice of Fernando I and Dña. Sancha. (Facundo/Facundus)
 Add MS 11695 British Library access to Beatus of Santo Domingo de Silos.
 Add MS 11695 Beatus of Santo Domingo de Silos. Click on image to access all pages.
 Ms. lat. 357 Geneva Beatus.
MS 8 Rylands Beatus (select images)
 Ms. 2. Cardeñas Beatus Some of the 135 folios online at the Museo Arqueólogico Nacional
 Cardeñas Beatus 15 folios at the Metropolitan Museum of Art
 ALC. 247 Beatus of Alcobaça. Not illustrated.
Beato ACA Not Illustrated.
 Beato de Sahagún Not illustrated.
MS 429 Huelgas Apocalypse
MS 429 Huelgas Apocalypse

Christian apocalyptic writings
Illuminated beatus manuscripts
Mozarabic art and architecture